The Roman Catholic Archdiocese of Cumaná is an archdiocese located in the city of Cumaná in Venezuela.

History
On 12 October 1922 Pope Pius XI established the Diocese of Cumaná from the Diocese of Santo Tomás de Guayana.  Blessed John Paul II elevated the diocese to an archdiocese on 16 May 1992.

Bishops

Ordinaries
Sixto Sosa Díaz † (16 Jun 1923 – 29 May 1943)
Crisanto Darío Mata Cova † (21 Oct 1949 – 30 Apr 1966) Appointed, Archbishop of Ciudad Bolívar
Mariano José Parra León † (30 Nov 1966 – 12 Mar 1987)
Alfredo José Rodríguez Figueroa † (12 Mar 1987 – 17 Sep 2001)
Diego Rafael Padrón Sánchez (27 Mar 2002 – 24 May 2018)
Jesús González de Zárate Salas (24 May 2018 – present)

Auxiliary bishops
Rafael Ignacio Arias Blanco (1937-1939), appointed Bishop of San Cristóbal de Venezuela
Pedro Pablo Tenreiro Francia (1939-1954), appointed Bishop of Guanare
Eduardo Herrera Riera (1965-1966), appointed Bishop of Guanare
Manuel Felipe Díaz Sánchez (1997-2000), appointed Bishop of Carúpano

Other priests of this diocese who became bishops
Antonio José Ramírez Salaverría, appointed Bishop of Maturín in 1958
Tomás Enrique Márquez Gómez, appointed Auxiliary Bishop of Ciudad Bolívar in 1963
Mariano José Parra Sandoval, appointed Bishop of San Fernando de Apure in 1994

Suffragan dioceses
 Barcelona
 Carúpano
 El Tigre
 Margarita

See also
Roman Catholicism in Venezuela

Sources

Roman Catholic dioceses in Venezuela
Roman Catholic Ecclesiastical Province of Cumaná
Christian organizations established in 1922
Roman Catholic dioceses and prelatures established in the 20th century
1922 establishments in Venezuela
Cumaná